Batafoé N’Gnoron Jeanne Audrey Larissa Alloh (born 21 July 1987) is a sprinter who competes internationally for Italy.

Biography
Alloh represented Italy at the 2008 Summer Olympics in Beijing. She competed at the 4 × 100 metres relay together with Anita Pistone, Giulia Arcioni and Vincenza Calì. In their first round heat they were however disqualified and eliminated for the final.

National records
 4 × 100 metres relay: 43.04 ( Annecy, 21 June 2008) – with Anita Pistone, Giulia Arcioni, Vincenza Calì – current holder

Achievements

National titles
She has won 5 times the individual national championship.
1 win in the 100 metres (2012)
4 wins in the 60 metres indoor (2012, 2013, 2014, 2015)

See also
 Italian records in athletics
 Italian all-time lists – 100 metres
 Italian all-time lists – 4 × 100 metres relay
 Italy national relay team

References

External links
 

1987 births
Living people
Olympic athletes of Italy
Athletes (track and field) at the 2008 Summer Olympics
Italian female sprinters
Sportspeople from Abidjan
Ivorian emigrants to Italy
Naturalised citizens of Italy
Athletics competitors of Fiamme Azzurre
Universiade medalists in athletics (track and field)
World Athletics Championships athletes for Italy
Athletes (track and field) at the 2013 Mediterranean Games
Mediterranean Games gold medalists for Italy
Mediterranean Games medalists in athletics
Universiade gold medalists for Italy
Medalists at the 2009 Summer Universiade
Olympic female sprinters